Peter William Ham (27 April 1947 – 24 April 1975) was a Welsh singer, songwriter and guitarist best known as a lead vocalist of and composer for the 1970s rock band Badfinger, whose hit songs include "No Matter What", "Day After Day" and "Baby Blue". He also co-wrote the ballad "Without You", a worldwide number-one hit for Harry Nilsson that has become a standard covered by hundreds of artists. Ham was granted two Ivor Novello Awards related to the song in 1973.

Ham died by suicide in 1975 at the age of 27, when he became depressed while embroiled in band-related issues, such as label and management problems, as well as a lack of funds. The emotional scar his death left on Badfinger eventually led to the suicide of former bandmate Tom Evans in 1983.

Early life 
Ham was born in Swansea, Wales. He formed a local rock group called The Panthers circa 1961. This group would undergo several name and line-up changes before it became The Iveys in 1965. The band was relocated to London by The Mojos manager, Bill Collins, in 1966, and they continued to perform for three years throughout the United Kingdom. Ham eventually became the prominent songwriter for the band, after a Revox tape recorder was made available by Collins to encourage him. Ray Davies of The Kinks took an initial interest in the group, although tracks produced by Davies did not surface commercially until decades later. In 1968, The Iveys came to the attention of Mal Evans (The Beatles' personal assistant) and were eventually signed to the Beatles' Apple Records label after approval from all four Beatles, who were reportedly impressed by the band's songwriting abilities.

Badfinger 
The Iveys changed their name to Badfinger with the single release of "Come and Get It", a composition written by Paul McCartney that became a worldwide top-ten hit. Ham had initially protested against using a non-original to promote the band, as he had gained confidence in the group's compositions, but he was quickly convinced of the springboard effect of having a likely hit single. His own creative perseverance paid off eventually, as his "No Matter What" became another top-ten worldwide hit in late 1970. He followed up with two more worldwide hits in "Day After Day" and "Baby Blue".

Ham's greatest songwriting success came with his co-written composition  with bandmate Tom Evans called  "Without You" – a worldwide number-one when it was later covered by Harry Nilsson and released in 1971. The song has since become a standard and has been covered by hundreds of singers. An Ivor Novello award for Song of the Year was issued in 1973 along with Grammy nominations. George Harrison used Ham's talents for a number of album sessions, including on the All Things Must Pass album and for other Apple Records artist's recordings. This friendship culminated with Ham's acoustic guitar duet on "Here Comes the Sun" with Harrison at The Concert for Bangladesh in 1971, documented in the theatrical film of the concert. In 1972, Badfinger was picked up by Warner Bros. Records, as the Apple Records label was crumbling and it seemed the band was primed for major recognition.

Death 
Warner Bros. Records sued Badfinger's business manager, Stan Polley, after an advance vanished. With their current album suddenly withdrawn and their follow-up rejected, Badfinger spent the early months of 1975 trying to figure out how to proceed under the unclear legal situation. Their March 1975 salary cheques did not clear, and the April cheques never arrived. Panic set in, especially for Ham, who had recently bought a £30,000 house in Woking, Surrey, and whose girlfriend was expecting a child. According to 1974-1975 bandmate Bob Jackson, the band tried to continue without Polley's involvement by contacting booking agents and prospective managers throughout London, but they were routinely declined because of their restrictive contracts with Polley and impending legal actions. Ham reportedly tried on many occasions to contact Polley by telephone during the early months of 1975, but was never able to reach him.

On the night of 23 April 1975, Ham received a phone call from the United States, telling him that all his money had disappeared. Later that night he met Tom Evans and they went to The White Hart Pub in Surrey together, where Ham drank ten whiskies. Evans drove him home at three o'clock on the morning of 24 April 1975. Ham hanged himself at the age of 27 in his garage studio in Woking later that morning. His suicide note—addressed to his girlfriend, Anne Herriot, and her son, Blair—blamed Polley for much of his despair and inability to cope with his disappointments in life. The note read: "Anne, I love you. Blair, I love you. I will not be allowed to love and trust everybody. This is better. Pete. P.S. Stan Polley is a soulless bastard. I will take him with me". 

Ham had shown growing signs of mental illness over the past months, with Gibbins remembering Ham burning cigarettes on his hands and arms. He was cremated at the Morriston Crematorium, Swansea; his ashes were spread in the memorial gardens. Ham's daughter, Petera, was born one month after his death.  In May, Warner Bros terminated its contract with Badfinger, and Badfinger dissolved.  Around that time, Apple also deleted all of Badfinger's albums from its catalogue.

Legacy 

Ham is often credited as being one of the earliest purveyors of the power pop genre. His most widespread effect in popular music was with the ballad "Without You", which he wrote with Badfinger bandmate Tom Evans. Collections of Ham's home demo recordings have been released posthumously: 1997's 7 Park Avenue, 1999's Golders Green, and 2013's The Keyhole Street Demos 1966–67.  In 2022 Ham's "Demos Variety Pack" was released.

On 27 April 2013, an official blue plaque was unveiled by Swansea City Council to honour Pete Ham in his hometown. The unveiling was attended by two former members of the original Badfinger band, The Iveys: Ron Griffiths and David Jenkins, plus former Badfinger member Bob Jackson. The plaque honoured Ham and all the Iveys and Badfinger members of his lifetime. The ceremony was followed by a concert featuring former Badfinger members Bob Jackson and Al Wodtke.

Discography 

7 Park Avenue (1997)
Golders Green (1999)
The Keyhole Street Demos 1966–67 (2013)

Ham also appeared as a guest artist on
The Concert for Bangladesh (the concert, the album, and the film)
All Things Must Pass by George Harrison (album)
"It Don't Come Easy" by Ringo Starr (single)
"Try Some, Buy Some" by George Harrison (single)
Living in the Material World (uncredited) by George Harrison (album)

Charted singles 
"No Matter What" (Billboard charting number 8, by Badfinger)
"Without You" (Billboard charting number 1 by Harry Nilsson, number 3 by Mariah Carey, number 28 by Clay Aiken).
"Day After Day" (Billboard charting number 4, Cash Box charting number 1, both by Badfinger)
"Baby Blue" (Billboard charting number 14 by Badfinger)

See also 
27 Club, of which Ham is a member

References

External links 
 Pledgemusic page for Keyhole Street
 
 

1947 births
1975 deaths
Apple Records artists
Badfinger members
Musicians from Swansea
Rykodisc artists
Suicides by hanging in England
Warner Records artists
20th-century Welsh male singers
Welsh singer-songwriters
Welsh rock guitarists
Welsh keyboardists
Lead guitarists
Slide guitarists
Ivor Novello Award winners
Power pop musicians
20th-century British guitarists
1975 suicides